Péter Bacsa (born 21 November 1970, in Dorog) is a Hungarian former wrestler who competed in the 1996 Summer Olympics.

References

External links 
 
 

1970 births
Living people
Olympic wrestlers of Hungary
Wrestlers at the 1996 Summer Olympics
Hungarian male sport wrestlers
Sportspeople from Komárom-Esztergom County